Ross Peraudo (born 7 November 1992 in Venaria Reale, Italy) is an alpine skier who competes for Australia. He competed for Australia at the 2014 Winter Olympics in the alpine skiing events.

References

1992 births
Australian male alpine skiers
Italian male alpine skiers
Italian emigrants to Australia
Alpine skiers at the 2014 Winter Olympics
Olympic alpine skiers of Australia
Living people
People from Venaria Reale
Sportspeople from the Metropolitan City of Turin